King of Punk is a documentary film directed and produced by Kenneth van Schooten and Julie van Schooten.
The documentary film includes interviews with members of bands involved in the Punk scene between 1976 and 1982 including Ramones, Adicts, Exploited, Avengers, Dead Boys, UK Subs, Zeros, Wayne County & the Electric Chairs and many other artists.
They talk about this music form and the music industry in general.

It also profiles OBGYN, an all-girl Punk band based in Fayetteville, NC, and Patrick Clement, owner of Boston's FNS Publishing.
The film's title, King of Punk, is based on one of OBGYN's song titles and doesn't refer to any one person.

The King of Punk documentary was released on DVD in 2007.

Interviewees
Interviewees include:
Shonna and Dave Ryan, Abrasive Wheels
Keith 'Monkey' Warren, The Adicts
Penelope Houston, Avengers
Jack Rabid, Big Takeover
Jayne County
Cheetah Chrome, Dead Boys
Joe Keithley, D.O.A.
Wattie Buchan, The Exploited
Dave Dictor and Ron Posner, MDC
Marky Ramone, Ramones
Dave Parsons, Sham69
Jake Burns and Bruce Foxton, Stiff Little Fingers
Sonny Vincent, Testors
Charlie Harper, UK Subs
Robert 'El Vez' Lopez, Zeros

External links
King of Punk website
King of Punk on IMDB

2007 films
Documentary films about punk music and musicians
2007 documentary films